Cousin Argia (La cugina Argia) is an 1861 oil on card painting by Giovanni Fattori, now in the Gallery of Modern Art in Florence. A label on the reverse is inscribed "Gio. Fattori alla sua cugina Argia. Anno 1861" (Giovanni Fattori to his dear cousin Argia. The year 1861), but this may not be in the artist's own hand and no Argia is known in his family.

References

Paintings by Giovanni Fattori
Paintings in the collection of the Gallery of Modern Art (Florence)
Portraits of women
19th-century portraits
1861 paintings